Cycling, for the 2013 Island Games, took place throughout the whole of Bermuda. This sport was contested from the 14 to 18 July 2013.

Medal summary

Medal table
Bermuda 2013 IG Cycling Medalists

Men

Women

References

2013 Island Games
2013 in road cycling
2013 in men's road cycling
2013 in women's road cycling
2013
2013 in mountain biking